Al-Askari Shrine, the Askariyya Shrine (meaning "Resting Place of the Two Imams Ali al-Hadi and Hassan the al-Askari") or the Al-Askari Mosque is a Shia Muslim mosque and mausoleum in the Iraqi city of Samarra  from Baghdad. It is one of the most important Shia shrines in the world. It was built in 944. The dome was destroyed in a bombing by extremists in February 2006 and its two remaining minarets were destroyed in another bombing in June 2007, causing widespread anger among Shias. The remaining clock tower was also destroyed in July 2007. The dome and minarets were repaired and the mosque reopened in April 2009.

The 10th and 11th Shī'ite Imams, 'Alī al-Hādī ("an-Naqī") and his son Hasan al-'Askarī, known as al-'Askariyyayn ("the two Askarīs"), are buried in the shrine. Housed in the mosque are also the tombs of Hakimah Khātūn, sister of 'Alī al-Hādī; and Narjis Khātūn, the mother of Muħammad al-Mahdī. Adjacent to the mosque is another domed commemorative building, the Serdab ("cistern"), built over the cistern where the Twelfth Imam, Muħammad al-Mahdī, first entered the Minor Occultation or "hidden from the view"—whence the other title of the Mahdi, the Hidden Imam.

History
The Imams 'Alī al-Hādī ("an-Naqī") and Hassan al-'Askarī lived under house arrest in the part of Samarra that had been Caliph al-Mu'tasim's military camp (Askar al-Mu‘tasim, hence an inmate of the camp was called an Askarī). As a result, they are known as the Askariyyayn. They died and were buried in their house on Abī Ahmad Street near the mosque built by Mu'tasim. A later tradition attributes their deaths to poison.

Nasir ad-Din Shah Qajar undertook the latest remodelling of the shrine in 1868, with the golden dome added in 1905. Covered in 72,000 gold pieces and surrounded by walls of light blue tiles, the dome was a dominant feature of the Samarra skyline.

Bombings

2006 attack

On 22 February 2006, at 6:55 am local time (03:55 UTC) explosions occurred at the shrine, effectively destroying its golden dome and severely damaging the shrine. Several men belonging to Iraqi insurgent groups affiliated with Al-Qaida, one wearing a military uniform, had earlier entered the mosque, tied up the guards there and set explosives, resulting in the blast. Two bombs were set off by five to seven men dressed as personnel of the Iraqi Special Forces who entered the shrine during the morning.

Time magazine reported at the time of the 2006 bombing that:

2007 attack

At around 8 am on 13 June 2007, operatives belonging to al-Qaeda in Iraq destroyed the two remaining  golden minarets flanking the dome's ruins.  No fatalities were reported. Iraqi police reported hearing "two nearly simultaneous explosions coming from inside the mosque compound at around 8 am". A report from state-run Iraqiya Television stated that "local officials said that two mortar rounds were fired at the two minarets".

Reopening
In late 2007, the Iraqi government conducted a contract with a Turkish company to rebuild the shrine. The Iraqi government later cancelled the contract due to delays by the Turkish company. As of April 2009, the golden dome and the minarets have been restored and the shrine reopened to visitors.

Gallery

See also

 Bab al-Saghir
 Damage to Baghdad during the Iraq War
 Destruction of early Islamic heritage sites in Saudi Arabia
 Holiest sites in Shia Islam
 Jannat al-Mu'alla
 Jannatul Baqi'

References

Further reading
  Abstract (characteristic of Smithsonian feature articles): "In 2006, sectarian violence engulfed Iraq after terrorists destroyed the Mosque of the Golden Dome, built on a site sacred to Shiites for 1,100 years.  Today, Sunnis and Shiites are working together to restore the shrine and the war-torn city."

ICOMOS Heritage at Risk 2006/2007: Iraq, Askariya Shrine

External links

 Ernst Herzfeld Papers, Records of Samarra Expeditions, Shiite Shrine Complex Collections Search Center, S.I.R.I.S., Smithsonian Institution, Washington, D.C.
 Ernst Herzfeld Papers, Series 7: Records of Samarra Expeditions, 1906–1945 Freer Gallery of Art and Arthur M. Sackler Gallery Archives, Smithsonian Institution, Washington, D.C.
Images of the destruction: before and after
BBC picture gallery
BBC video
NYT picture gallery

Alaskariyain holy shrine official page
Disappointment in Samarra

Shia mosques in Iraq
Mosques in Iraq
Shrines in Iraq
Mausoleums in Iraq
Tourist attractions in Iraq
Buildings and structures in Samarra
Religious buildings and structures completed in 944
Safavid architecture
10th-century mosques
Shia shrines